In Luritja religion and mythology, Njirana is a god, father of Julana, who was alive during the Dreamtime.

References

Australian Aboriginal gods